This is a list of notable events in country music that took place in the year 1971.

Events

No dates
Seeking younger, more urban viewers, CBS cancels nearly all of its rural-themed programming. Among the most notable casualties:
 The Beverly Hillbillies – a sitcom which had aired since 1962, about the misadventures of an Appalachia clan who become oil tycoons.
 Green Acres – another sitcom about a New York attorney and his wife who move to the country and start farming.
 Hee Haw – the country music-variety show starring Roy Clark and Buck Owens.
 Fans of Hee Haw were quickly soothed when the show entered syndication in the fall. The show was an immediate success, and viewers would continue to make their weekly visit to Kornfield County for the next 20 years. Meanwhile, both The Beverly Hillbillies and Green Acres would continue to live on in syndication.
 ABC, also hoping to draw in younger viewers, canceled, among other shows, The Johnny Cash Show. Although not country-music oriented, The Lawrence Welk Show, which had among its older-leaning demographics country music fans, is also canceled, but like Hee Haw will be revived in the fall in syndication to great success.
 Up-and-coming country music star Mickey Gilley and business partner Sherwood Cryer open Gilley's, a bar/honky tonk that was featured in the 1980 movie Urban Cowboy, and became famous for featuring up-and-coming country acts and its mechanical bulls.

Top hits of the year

Number one hits

United States
(as certified by Billboard)

Notes
1^ No. 1 song of the year, as determined by Billboard.
2^ Song dropped from No. 1 and later returned to top spot.
A^ First Billboard No. 1 hit for that artist.
C^ Only Billboard No. 1 hit for that artist to date.

Canada
(as certified by RPM)

Notes
2^ Song dropped from No. 1 and later returned to top spot.
A^ First RPM No. 1 hit for that artist.
B^ Last RPM No. 1 hit for that artist.
C^ Only RPM No. 1 hit for that artist.

Other major hits

Singles released by American artists

Singles released by Canadian artists

Top new album releases

Births
 January 17 – Kid Rock (born Robert Ritchie), white rap vocalist who had major country hits with "Picture" (duet with Sheryl Crow) and "All Summer Long."
 February 5 — Sara Evans, female vocalist from the late 1990s–2000s (decade).
 March 4 – Jason Sellers, singer-songwriter.
 March 10 – Daryle Singletary, neotraditonialist singer of the 1990s (died 2018).
 April 26 — Jay DeMarcus, member of Rascal Flatts.
 May 16 — Rick Trevino, Mexican-American singer who had several hits in the 1990s.
 April 30 — Carolyn Dawn Johnson, singer-songwriter.
 July 23 — Alison Krauss, bluegrass artist, vocalist and leader of Union Station.
 October 20 – Jimi Westbrook, member of Little Big Town.

Deaths
 February 7 — Dock Boggs, 73, influential old-time country singer.
 February 28 – Fiddlin' Arthur Smith, 72, old-time fiddle player.
 June 12 — J. E. Mainer, 72, old-time fiddle player and early country music star.
 August 7 – Henry D. "Homer" Haynes, 50, of the Homer and Jethro comedy duo.
 August 20 — Tom Darby, 79, one half of the duo Darby and Tarlton, an early country music duo.

Country Music Hall of Fame Inductees
Arthur Edward Satherley (1889–1986)

Major awards

Grammy Awards
Best Female Country Vocal Performance — "Help Me Make It Through the Night", Sammi Smith
Best Male Country Vocal Performance — "When You're Hot, You're Hot", Jerry Reed
Best Country Performance by a Duo or Group with Vocal — "After the Fire Is Gone", Loretta Lynn and Conway Twitty
Best Country Instrumental Performance — "Snowbird" Chet Atkins
Best Country Song — "Help Me Make It Through the Night", Kris Kristofferson (Performer: Sammi Smith)

Juno Awards
Country Male Vocalist of the Year — Stompin' Tom Connors
Country Female Vocalist of the Year — Myrna Lorrie
Country Group or Duo of the Year — Mercey Brothers

Academy of Country Music
Entertainer of the Year — Freddie Hart
Song of the Year — "Easy Loving", Freddie Hart (Performer: Freddie Hart)
Single of the Year — "Easy Loving", Freddie Hart
Album of the Year — Easy Loving, Freddie Hart
Top Male Vocalist — Freddie Hart
Top Female Vocalist — Loretta Lynn
Top Vocal Duo — Conway Twitty and Loretta Lynn
Top New Male Vocalist — Tony Booth
Top New Female Vocalist — Barbara Mandrell

Country Music Association
Entertainer of the Year — Charley Pride
Song of the Year — "Easy Loving", Freddie Hart (Performer: Freddie Hart)
Single of the Year — "Help Me Make It Through the Night", Sammi Smith
Album of the Year — I Won't Mention It Again, Ray Price
Male Vocalist of the Year — Charley Pride
Female Vocalist of the Year — Lynn Anderson
Vocal Duo of the Year — Porter Wagoner and Dolly Parton
Vocal Group of the Year — Osborne Brothers
Instrumentalist of the Year — Jerry Reed
Instrumental Group of the Year — Danny Davis and the Nashville Brass

References

Further reading
Kingsbury, Paul, "The Grand Ole Opry: History of Country Music. 70 Years of the Songs, the Stars and the Stories," Villard Books, Random House; Opryland USA, 1995
Kingsbury, Paul, "Vinyl Hayride: Country Music Album Covers 1947–1989," Country Music Foundation, 2003
Millard, Bob, "Country Music: 70 Years of America's Favorite Music," HarperCollins, New York, 1993
Whitburn, Joel, "Top Country Songs 1944–2005 – 6th Edition." 2005.

Other links
Country Music Association
Inductees of the Country Music Hall of Fame

External links
Country Music Hall of Fame

Country
Country music by year